Hilihang is a rural municipality (gaunpalika) in the Panchthar District of Province No. 1, in Nepal. There are a total of 8 municipalities in Panchthar of which 1 is urban and 7 are rural.

22913 as of the Census of Nepal 2011.

Ambarpur, Panchami, Subhang and Bharapa, which previously were all separate Village development committees, merged to form this new local level body. This was a requirement of the 2015 Constitution of Nepal under which the Ministry of Federal Affairs and Local Development merged all old VDCs and Municipalities into 753 new local level bodies.

The rural municipality is divided into seven wards. Its headquarters is in Panchami.

References

External links
 Official website
 Final District 1-75 Corrected Last for RAJPATRA

Rural municipalities in Koshi Province
Populated places in Panchthar District
Rural municipalities of Nepal established in 2017
Rural municipalities in Panchthar District